Guthigaru or Guthigar is a village at Sullia taluk of Dakshina Kannada district.

Other links 
  Elected member of Zilla Parishat

Villages in Dakshina Kannada district